Glenwood Elementary School may refer to:

 Glenwood Elementary School (British Columbia)
 Glenwood Elementary School (California)
 Glenwood Elementary School (Georgia)
 Glenwood Elementary School (Massachusetts)
 Glenwood Elementary School (North Carolina)